David Dubery (Durban, 1948) is a South-African born British composer, pianist, vocal coach and academic. Dubery has been a music staff tutor at Long Millgate, Elizabeth Gaskell and Didsbury Colleges, Manchester Polytechnic,/Metropolitan University, and Manchester School of Music for fourteen years (1972-1986), Manchester branch of The Actor’s Centre, Northern Actor’s Centre, and was vocal tutor/staff pianist & musical director for the Northern Ballet School for sixteen years (1986–99). He also coached tenor  Russell Watson.

Recordings
David Dubery: Songs & Chamber Music - "Sonatina for Oboe and Piano". Three Songs to Poems by Robert Graves. Four Songs. Suite from ‘Degrees of Evidence’. "Remember". Two Stopfordian Impressions. Sonata for Cello and Piano Escapades. Walking Cimbrone. Harlequinade. "Mrs Harris in Paris". Adrienne Murray (mezzo-soprano with David Dubery piano), John Turner, Paul Janes, Craig Ogden, Peter Dixon, Richard Simpson, Graham Salvage, Richard Williamson. Metier MSV28523 2011
David Dubery; Observations. Seventeen songs and a string quartet. Three songs to poems by Douglas Gibson. Full fathom five. Time will not wait. Night Songs. Observations (6 songs to poems by Walter de la Mare). Cuarteto Ibérico (Ghosts of times past) for string quartet. James Gilchrist (tenor), Adrienne Murray (mezzo-soprano), Michael Cox (flute), David Dubery (piano) Cavaleri Quartet. Metier msv28548 2014
Anthony Burgess “The man and his Music”. Sonata for recorder & piano. John Turner (recorder), Harvey Davies (piano). Metier msv77202 
Antony Hopkins “A portrait”. “Evening in April”. Lesley-Jane Rogers (soprano), John Turner (recorder), Janet Simpson (piano). Divine art dda21217 
British Recorder Concertos “Mrs Harris in Paris” John Turner (recorder), Camerata Ensemble conducted by Philip McKenzie. Dutton CDLX7154

Publications 
Home is the Sailor                                         Two part song with Piano                               Roberton / Goodmusic 1980

The Wassail Bowl                                           SATB a cappella                                             MSM 1985

The Birds                                                        Medium Voice & Piano                                    MSM 1985

Threesome for Two Players/ Sonatina        Oboe & Piano                                                Sunshine Music/Spartan Press 1994

Sonatina                                                         Recorder & Piano                                           Peacock Press 2003

Mrs Harris in Paris                                       Treble Recorder or Flute & Piano                    Peacock Press 2004

Three Songs to Poems by Robert Graves    Medium Voice, Recorder (S/A) & Piano        Peacock Press 2005

Away in a Manger (One night in December) Medium Voice, Flute or Recorder, & Piano   Peacock Press 2007

Harlequinade                                                 Recorder & Guitar or Harpsichord                   Peacock Press 2010

A Bran Tub                                                      Descant Recorder & Piano                             Peacock Press 2010

Pipe Pieces                                                     Descant Recorder                                          Forsyth 1996

Two Stopfordian Impressions                      Recorder or Oboe & Piano                             Forsyth 2010

Walking Cimbrone                                         Bassoon & Piano                                             Emerson Edition 2010

Escapades                                                      Flute or Recorder, Bassoon, & Piano              Emerson Edition 2012

Since dawn is breaking                                 Sonata for oboe and piano                              Emerson Edition 2016

An Aldeburgh Memoir: A first visit to the Aldeburgh Festival 1968.

Manchester Sounds Volume 6-2006 Pages 145-151 / The Manchester Musical Heritage Trust in association with Forsyth

Return to Aldeburgh: An account of the Adelburgh festival 1969 as a Duke of Hesse Scholar.

Manchester Sounds/ Volume 8-2010 Pages 188-215 / The Manchester Musical Heritage Trust in association with Forsyth

External links 
https://uk.linkedin.com/pub/david-dubery/79/8b3/8a2

References

1948 births
Academics of Manchester Metropolitan University
Living people
20th-century classical composers
British classical composers
British male classical composers
English classical composers
21st-century classical composers
20th-century British composers
21st-century British musicians
Alumni of the Royal Northern College of Music
20th-century British male musicians
21st-century British male musicians